Active since 1995, Mail Order Brides/M.O.B. is a Filipina American artist trio known for their use of humor and camp to explore issues of culture and gender. Founded in San Francisco by artists Eliza Barrios, Reanne Estrada, and Jenifer K. Wofford, the group's full name, Mail Order Brides/M.O.B., conflates a once-common stereotype of Filipina women as "mail order brides" with an acronym suggestive of an organized crime organization. The group has often been referred to in shorthand as "M.O.B."

In addition to their karaoke videos and performances, M.O.B. is well known for installations, public service posters, and workshops.

Mail Order Brides/M.O.B.’s work has been exhibited at the San Jose Museum of Art, the M.H. de Young Museum, Yerba Buena Center for the Arts, the Triton Museum of Art, the Chinatown Cultural Center in San Francisco, Kearny Street Workshop, the Luggage Store, and with the San Francisco Art Commission. Their film/video works have screened at the San Francisco International Asian American Film Festival, the International Gay and Lesbian Film Festival, the Mix Festival and the International Film Festival in Detroit.

Projects

Market Street Art In Transit, 1998 

Mail Order Brides/M.O.B. created a series of posters for the San Francisco Art Commission’s Market Street Art In Transit project that were displayed along Market Street.

Museum Pieces: Bay Area Artists Consider the de Young, 1999 

Prior to the 2nd demolition and new construction of the M.H. de Young Museum in Golden Gate Park, guest curator Glen Helfand selected 18 site-specific works to be commissioned and included in the exhibition Museum Pieces that opened in 1999. As part of the exhibition the Mail Order Brides/M.O.B. surveyed visitors to learn how to make the museum space more inviting. Based on the responses they collected, the artists created an installation that incorporated decorating solutions for the museum.

Mail Order Bride of Frankenstein, 2002 

As part of their residency at the McColl Center for Visual Art in Charlotte, North Carolina the collaborative team filmed the karaoke horror film “Mail Order Bride of Frankenstein” (video) as part of their “Karaoke Trilogy” that included “What Now My Love” and “Holiday” (video). The work screened at the 23rd Annual SF International LGBT Film Festival; SF International Asian American Film Festival, Mix Festival (NY)

Always A BridesMaid Never A Bride, 2005 

Offering "Professional Bridesmaid" services to those in need. Installation and infomercial videos created for Yerba Buena Center for The Arts' signature Bay Area Now 4 exhibition

Manananggoogle, 2013 

Inspired by the Manananggal, a mythical, vampire-like creature from Philippine mythology, the collective created an installation and performance piece parodying corporate culture. This project was commissioned by curator Monica Ramirez-Montagut at the San Jose Museum of Art.

Manananggoogle later hosted an "Onboarding" performance event at the Global Fund for Women's office in San Francisco for Southern Exposure's Long Conversation Show for their 39th Anniversary. Manananggoogle has also hosted recruitment events in the San Diego/Tijuana border area, and team-building activities at San Francisco's Somarts Cultural Center.

References

Further reading
 "Having Your Art and Eating It Too", Filipinas Magazine, Renee Macalino Rutledge, November 2005
 “Forever on the Move,” Amy Berk, World Sculpture News, Winter 2000, p 30-35
 “Genial Deconstruction of the de Young Museum,” David Bonetti, S.F. Examiner, Nov. 26, 1999
 “Local Heroes,” Kenneth Baker, San Francisco Chronicle, Nov. 20, 1999
 The Metropolitan “Mail Order Brides engage SF with their unusual brand of campy, goofy fun,” by Christine Brenneman, October 19 – November 1, 1998

External links 
 WoffleHouse – MOB
 https://www.elizabarrios.com/collab-mob
 Eliza Barrios | MOB on Vimeo
 Christine Brenneman interviews MOB | From October 19-November 1, 1998 issue of the Metropolitan

American performance artists
American contemporary artists
Artists from the San Francisco Bay Area
American artist groups and collectives
Performance artist collectives
American women artists